Good Job is a 2022 South Korean television series starring Jung Il-woo and Kwon Yu-ri, which is an original drama of OTT media service Seezn. It aired from August 24 to September 29, 2022 on ENA's Wednesdays and Thursdays at 21:00 (KST) time slot.

Synopsis
The series revolves around a genius and athletic chaebol who lives a double life as a detective, and a poor woman who has cheerful personality and was born with super vision but tries to hide her ability by wearing thick glasses.

Cast

Main
 Jung Il-woo as Eun Seon-woo
 Kwon Yu-ri as Don Se-ra

Supporting
 Eum Moon-suk as Yang Jin-mo
 Song Sang-eun as Sa Na-hee
 Jo Young-jin as Kang Wan-su
 Yoon Sun-woo as Kang Tae-joon
 Lee Jun-hyeok as Chief Hong
 Hong Woo-jin as Kim Jae-ha
 Cha Rae-hyung as Han Kwang-gi
 Shin Yeon-woo as Lee Dong-hee

Extended
 Shin Go-eun as Oh Ah-ra
 Min Chae-eun as Han Soo-ah
 Lee Na-ra as Park Eun-jung
 Bae Eun-woo as Ra Min-ji

Special appearance
 Kim Jung-hwa as Seon-woo's mother

Production
It was reported that filming was scheduled to begin in April 2022.

On July 20, 2022, the production team announced that the main director of Good Job—Ryu Seung-jin would change his position to creator and would work on the script to improve the overall quality of the series. He was replaced by director Kang Min-gu.

Original soundtrack

Part 1

Viewership

References

External links
  
 
 
 

Korean-language television shows
ENA television dramas
South Korean mystery television series
South Korean fantasy television series
South Korean romance television series
2022 South Korean television series debuts
2022 South Korean television series endings